Xiengkeo Palace was the former royal residence of the Lao Prime Minister, Prince Phetsarath in Luang Prabang, French Laos, now Laos. The buildings were French colonial in style. After the communist revolution, it was converted into a hotel and renamed the Grand Luang Prabang hotel.

References

Palaces in Laos
Royal residences in Laos
Buildings and structures in Luang Prabang
French colonial architecture